Francis Edward Millard (May 31, 1914 – October 19, 1958) was an American wrestler who competed in the 1936 Summer Olympics. In 1936, he won the silver medal in the Freestyle featherweight competition.

External links
 

1914 births
1958 deaths
Wrestlers at the 1936 Summer Olympics
American male sport wrestlers
Olympic silver medalists for the United States in wrestling
Medalists at the 1936 Summer Olympics
20th-century American people